Ralph Edward Suggs (born May 12, 1947) is a retired Rear Admiral in the United States Navy.

Biography
A native of Whiteville, North Carolina, Suggs is a 1969 graduate of North Carolina State University. He was the Director of Field Service Operations of Harley-Davidson and resided in Cedarburg, Wisconsin.

Career
Suggs was commissioned an officer in the Navy in 1970. He earned his aviation wings the following year. Later he also participated in Operation Southern Watch. He retired in 2000.

Following his military career, he was general manager of the Harley Owners Group and Rider Services, which has 1.2 million members worldwide.

In June 2010, he returned to his alma mater to become the executive director of the North Carolina State Alumni Association

Awards he received include the Defense Distinguished Service Medal, the Legion of Merit with four oak leaf clusters, the Defense Meritorious Service Medal, the Meritorious Service Medal, and the Navy Commendation Medal with oak leaf cluster.

References

1947 births
Living people
People from Whiteville, North Carolina
North Carolina State University alumni
United States Naval Aviators
Recipients of the Legion of Merit
United States Navy admirals
Recipients of the Defense Distinguished Service Medal